Valentina Picca (born 24 June 1988) is an Italian professional racing cyclist, who last rode for the UCI Women's Team  during the 2019 women's road cycling season.

References

External links
 

1988 births
Living people
Italian female cyclists
People from Pinerolo
Sportspeople from the Metropolitan City of Turin
Cyclists from Piedmont